Edmund John Stanfield (8 April 1902 – 18 June 1960), known in Argentina as Edmundo Stanfield, was an Irish rugby union footballe who played for Club Atlético San Isidro and the Argentina national rugby union team.

Career 
Stanfield played at fly-half for the CASI, where he had started his career in the late 1910s. In the Club Atlético San Isidro, he won several championships organized by the URBA.

Stanfield was a player and Coach of Los Pumas. He played his first test match against Springboks, on 16 July 1932. That same year Stanfield was appointed as Coach of the national team.

References

External links 
www.pacificrugby.com.ar

1902 births
1960 deaths
Rugby union players from Belfast
Argentina international rugby union players
Argentine rugby union players
Irish rugby union players
Irish expatriates in Argentina
Club Atlético San Isidro rugby union players
Río de la Plata
Rugby union fly-halves